A jurisdiction is an area with a set of laws under the control of a system of courts or government entity which are different from neighbouring areas.

Each state in a federation such as Australia, Germany and the United States forms a separate jurisdiction. However, sometimes certain laws in a federal state are uniform across the constituent states and enforced by a set of federal courts; with a result that the federal state forms a single jurisdiction for that purpose.

It is also possible for a jurisdiction to prosecute for crimes committed somewhere outside its jurisdiction, once the perpetrator returns. In some cases, a citizen of another jurisdiction outside its own can be extradited to a jurisdiction where the crime is illegal, even if it was not committed in that jurisdiction.

Unitary states are usually single jurisdictions, but the United Kingdom is a notable exception; it has three separate jurisdictions due to its three separate legal systems. China also has separate jurisdictions of Hong Kong and Macao.

See also
 Ecclesiastical jurisdiction
 Political division
 State (polity)
 Sovereign state
 Federated state
 State law
 Change of venue

Further reading
 Beale, Joseph H. (1935) A Treatise on the Conflict of Laws.  
 Dicey & Morris. (1993) The Conflict of Laws 12th edition. London: Sweet & Maxwell Ltd. (pp26/30) 
 McClean, David. (2000). Morris: The Conflict of Laws. London: Sweet & Maxwell Ltd.

References

Conflict of laws
International law